Flemingsbergsviken is a lake in Stockholm County, Södermanland, Sweden.  The lake is located just outside the southern suburbs of Stockholm.

Lakes of Stockholm County